Yingcheng Subdistrict is a subdistrict in Yingde, Guangdong, China. , it administers the following five residential neighborhoods and six villages: 
Chengzhong
Chengnan
Chengbei
Chengxi
Nanshan
Baisha Village
Aishanping Village
Jiangwan Village
Changling Village
Yanqian Village
Langbu Village

See also 
 List of township-level divisions of Guangdong

References 

Township-level divisions of Guangdong
Yingde